The Bob Baker Marionette Theater, founded by Bob Baker and Alton Wood in 1963, is the oldest children's theater company in Los Angeles. In June 2009, the theater was designated as a Los Angeles Historic-Cultural Monument. In early 2019, the theater moved to a new permanent home at 4949 York Blvd, Los Angeles, CA 90042.

History

At age eight, Bob Baker (1924-2014) trained with several different Los Angeles-based companies before giving his first professional performance as a puppeteer for director Mervyn LeRoy.  While attending Hollywood High School, he began manufacturing toy marionettes that sold both in Europe and the United States. After graduation he became an apprentice at the George Pal Animation Studios.  A year later he was promoted to head animator of Puppetoons. After World War II, Baker served as an animation advisor at many film studios, including Disney. His puppetry was featured on TV in Bewitched, Star Trek,  Land of the Giants and NCIS; and on film in Bluebeard, A Star Is Born, G.I. Blues, Disney's Bedknobs and Broomsticks and Close Encounters of the Third Kind.

Baker and partner Alton Wood turned a run-down scenic shop near downtown Los Angeles into the Bob Baker Marionette Theater.

The theater was built in 1953. It is a one-story commercial building of modern Vernacular architecture. The theater is believed to have been built as a workshop for Academy Award-winning special effects artist M.B. Paul. In 1961, Baker and Alton Wood purchased the property for use as a live puppet theater and permanent showcase for hand-crafted marionettes.

The Bob Baker Marionette Theater is reportedly the longest-running puppet theater in the United States.

During the June 2009 Los Angeles City Council meeting at which the theater received its historic monument designation, Baker's marionettes made an appearance.  The Los Angeles Times described the scene:

Puppeteer Bob Baker died on November 28, 2014, at the age of 90 from natural causes.

Current
In 2019, The Bob Baker Marionette Theater gained 501(c)3 non-profit status, and relocated from the historic Downtown Los Angeles location, into a 1920's silent movie theater in Highland Park. Inspired by Bob Baker's original renderings, the new space has been transformed into "The Place Where Imagination Dwells". In addition to hosting their BBMT productions, Bob Baker Marionette Theater houses El Cine, a non-profit promoting Latinx culture through film. BBMT and El Cine frequently collaborate with local, mobile movie screening clubs, including La Collectionneuse(franco-centric club). These events will often include a Marionette show and movie screening. Sometimes they will include speakers, musicians, and receptions with drinks and discourse after.

See also
 List of Los Angeles Historic-Cultural Monuments in the Wilshire and Westlake areas
Le Theatre de Marionette

References

Sources
The New York Times bio on Bob Baker
  (Listen (Real Audio Player required))

External links
Bob Baker Marionette Theater

Article on Bob Baker Marionette Theatre at Atlas Obscura
3-D Scan of the Original Bob Baker Marionette Theater

Theatres in Los Angeles
Puppet troupes
Los Angeles Historic-Cultural Monuments
Children's theatre
Performing groups established in 1963
Westlake, Los Angeles
Theatres completed in 1953
1963 establishments in California
Puppetry in the United States